Deserticossus pulverulentus is a species of moth of the family Cossidae. It is found in Kazakhstan, Kyrgyzstan, Uzbekistan, Turkmenistan, north-western China (Xinjiang) and Israel.

The length of the forewings is 18–28 mm for males and 22–33 mm for females. The forewings are light with a suffusion of grey scales. The hindwings are white, with small black strokes at the veins. Adults have been recorded on wing in June in Israel.

References

Moths described in 1898
Cossinae
Moths of Asia